Ivanhrad is a village in Bakhmut Raion (district) in Donetsk Oblast of eastern Ukraine, at about  north-northeast (NNE) from the centre of Donetsk city, on the southern border of Bakhmut. It belongs to Bakhmut urban hromada, one of the hromadas of Ukraine.

The village came under attack by Russian forces in 2022, during the Russian invasion of Ukraine..On November 11 2022, Opytne was captured by DPR and Russian Armed Forces.

References

Villages in Bakhmut Raion